Operativo Independencia ("Operation Independence") was a 1975 Argentine military operation in Tucumán Province to crush the People's Revolutionary Army (ERP), a Guevarist guerrilla group which tried to create a Vietnam-style war front in the northwestern province. It was the first large-scale military operation of the Dirty War.

Background 

After the return of Juan Perón to Argentina, marked by the 20 June 1973 Ezeiza massacre which led to the split between left and right-wing Peronists, and then his return to the presidency in 1973, the ERP shifted to a rural strategy designed to secure a large land area as a base for military operations against the Argentine state. The ERP leadership chose to send Compañía de Monte Ramón Rosa Jiménez to the province of Tucumán at the edge of the long-impoverished Andean highlands in the northwest corner of Argentina.

By December 1974, the guerrillas numbered about 100 fighters, with a 400-person support network, although the size of the guerrilla platoons increased from February onwards as the ERP approached its maximum strength of between 300 and 500 men and women. Led by Mario Roberto Santucho, they soon established control over a third of the province and organized a base of some 2,500 sympathizers. The Montoneros' leadership was keen to learn from their experience, and sent "observers" to spend a few months with the ERP platoons operating in Tucumán.

Annihilation Actions decree 

The military operation to crush the insurgency was authorized by the Provisional President of the Senate, Ítalo Argentino Lúder, who was granted executive power during the absence (due to illness) of President Isabel Perón, in virtue of the "Ley de Acefalía" (law of succession). Ítalo Lúder issued the presidential decree 261/1975 which stated that the "general command of the Army will proceed to all of the necessary military operations to the effect of neutralizing or annihilating the actions of the subversive elements acting in Tucumán Province."

The Argentine military used the territory of the smallest Argentine province to implement, within the framework of the National Security Doctrine, the methods of the "counter-revolutionary warfare". These included the use of terrorism, kidnappings, forced disappearances and concentration camps where hundreds of guerrillas and their supporters in Tucumán were tortured and murdered. The logistical and operational superiority of the military, headed first by General Acdel Vilas, and from December 1975 by Antonio Domingo Bussi, succeeded in crushing the insurgency after a year and by destroying links the ERP, led by Roberto Santucho, had earlier established with the local population.

Brigadier-General Acdel Vilas deployed over 4,000 soldiers, including two companies of elite army commandos, backed by jets, dogs, helicopters, U.S. satellites and a Navy Beechcraft Queen Air B-80 equipped with infrared surveillance assets. The ERP did not enjoy much support from the local population and it needed to wage a terror campaign to be able to move at will among the towns of Santa Lucía, Los Sosa, Monteros and La Fronterita around Famaillá and the Monteros mountains, until the Fifth Brigade came on the scene, consisting of the 19th, 20th and 29th Regiments. and various support units.

State of emergency 
During his brief interlude as the nation's chief executive, interim President Ítalo Lúder extended the operation to the whole of the country through Decrees noº 2270, 2271 and 2272, issued on 6 July 1975. The July decrees created a Defense Council headed by the president, and including his ministers and the chiefs of the armed forces. It was given the command of the national and provincial police and correctional facilities and its mission was to "annihilate the actions of subversive elements throughout the country." Military control and the state of emergency was thus generalized to all of the country. The "counter-insurgency" tactics used by the French during the 1957 Battle of Algiers —such as relinquishing of civilian control to the military, state of emergency, block warden system ("quadrillage"), etc.— were perfectly imitated by the Argentine military.

These "annihilation Action decrees" are the source of the charges against Isabel Perón, which called for her arrest in Madrid more than thirty years later, in January 2007, but she was never extradited to Argentina due to her advanced age. The country was then divided into five military zones through a 28 October 1975 directive of struggle against subversion. As had been done during the 1957 Battle of Algiers, each zone was divided in subzones and areas, with its corresponding military responsibles. General Antonio Domingo Bussi replaced Acdel Vilas in December 1975 as responsible of the military operations. A reported 656 people disappeared in Tucumán between 1974 and 1979, 75% of which were laborers and labor union officials.

Operation

1975 
The deployment was completed by 9 February. The guerrillas who had laid low when the mountain brigade first arrived, soon began to strike at the commando units. It was during the second week of February that a platoon from the commando companies was ambushed at Río Pueblo Viejo, resulting in the deaths of an NCO and two guerrillas.
On 24 February, while supporting troops on the ground, a Piper PA-18 crashed near the town of Ingenio Santa Lucía, killing its two crewmen. On 28 February, an army corporal  was killed while inspecting an abandoned car rigged with an explosive charge in the city of Famaillá.

Three months of constant patrolling and 'cordon and search' operations with helicopter-borne troops, soon reduced the ERP's effectiveness in the Famaillá area, and so in June, elements of the 5th Brigade moved to the frontiers of Tucumán to guard against ERP and Montoneros guerrillas crossing into the province from Catamarca, and Santiago del Estero.

On 11 May, an Army NCO was killed during a fierce exchange of fire with guerrillas on Route 301 in Tucumán. That month, ERP representative Amílcar Santucho, brother of Roberto, was captured along with Jorge Fuentes Alarcón, a member of the Chilean Revolutionary Left Movement (MIR), trying to cross into Paraguay to promote the Revolutionary Coordinating Junta (JCR) unity effort with the MIR, the Uruguayan Tupamaros and the Bolivian National Liberation Army. During his interrogation, he provided information that helped the Argentine security agencies destroy the ERP.

On 28 May, an eight-hour gun battle took place between 114 guerrillas and 14 soldiers in Manchalá, without casualties on either side. Nevertheless, the guerrillas hastily escaped, leaving behind vehicles, weapons and documentation, which enabled the army to take the upper hand. By July, the commandos were carrying out search-and-destroy missions in the mountains. Army special forces discovered Santucho's hideout in August, then raided the ERP urban headquarters in September.

Nevertheless, the military was not to have everything its way. On 28 August, a bomb was planted at the Tucumán air base airstrip by Montoneros, in a support action for their comrades in the ERP. The blast destroyed an Air Force C-130 transport carrying 114 anti-guerrilla Gendarmerie commandos heading for home leave, killing six and wounding 29. The following day saw the derailment of a train carrying troops back from the guerrilla front about 64 kilometers south of the city of Tucumán, this time without any casualties. Most of the Compañía de Monte's general staff were killed in a special forces raid in October, but the guerrilla units continued to fight. Between 7 and 8 October, six soldiers were killed during an ambush.

On 10 October, a UH-1H helicopter was hit by small arms fire during an offensive reconnaissance mission near Acheral, killing its door gunner. After an emergency landing, other helicopters carried out rocket attacks on the reedbed. A total of 13 guerrillas were killed in the ensuing firefight. On 17 October, near Los Sosas, an army platoon was ambushed losing four men. On 24 October, during a night mission that took place on the banks of Fronterista River, three men from the 5th Brigade were killed. Between 8 and 16 November 1975, there were other engagements in which the 5th Brigade suffered another three losses.

On 18 December, Acdel Vilas was relieved from his post and Antonio Domingo Bussi assumed command of the operations. Shortly afterwards, Bussi told Vilas over the phone: "Vilas, you have left me nothing to do." On 29 December, Bussi launched Operation La Madrid I, the first of a series of four search and destroy operations.

1976 
The mountain and parachute units remained essential as military support for the local police and gendarmerie security forces, as well as the apprehension of several hundred ERP and Montoneros guerrillas who were still operating in the jungles and mountains, and sympathizers hidden among the civilian population in what was described by the American newspaper Baltimore Sun as a "growing 'Viet war'" During the first week of January, the army commandos discovered seven guerrilla hideouts.

During February 1976, in an effort to rekindle the rural front in Tucumán, Montoneros sent in reinforcements in the form of a company of their elite "Jungle Troops", which was initially commanded by Juan Carlos Alsogaray (El Hippie), son of General Julio Alsogaray, who had served as head of the Argentine Army from 1966 to 1968. The ERP also sent reinforcements to Tucumán in the form of their elite Decididos de Córdoba Company from Córdoba.
Bussi achieved a major success on 13 February when the 14th Airborne Infantry Regiment killed "el Hippie" and ambushed his elite Montoneros company. Two soldiers and some 10 guerrillas were killed in this action. On 30 March, a police officer was gunned down while patrolling in downtown Tucumán.

On 10 April, a private was killed in a guerrilla ambush and a policeman was gunned down while standing guard at a hospital.
In mid-April, in a major operation conducted against the ERP underground network in the province of Córdoba, the 4th Airborne Infantry Brigade took into custody and forcibly disappeared some 300 activists.
On 26 April, inspector general Juan Sirnio of the Tucumán Police was shot dead in his car by unknown perpetrators. The same day, the Montoneros guerrillas also killed a retired colonel outside his home in Tucumán.

On 5 May, during an armed reconnaissance mission, an army UH-1H crashed on the banks of Río Caspichango, killing five of its seven crew members. On 7 May, in a gunfight close to a river, another corporal was killed in a guerrilla ambush.
On 10 May, a private was shot dead by nervous sentries while stationed in Famaillá or committed suicide, although journalist Marcos Taire suggested that the Argentine Army was involved in a dastardly action.

On 17 May, two soldiers died in a remote-controlled bomb blast near the town of Caspinchango. In 2013, journalist Marcos Taire who appeared in the El Azúcar y la Sangre 2007 documentary praising the leftist militants in Tucumán, wrote that the Argentine military campaign in the province was a hoax and that the ambulance was blown up on purpose in an Argentine Army false-flag incident.

On 19 October, the Compañía de Monte's commander, Lionel MacDonald, was gunned down along two other fighters. Throughout 1976, a total of 24 patrol battles took place, resulting in the deaths of at least 74 guerrillas and 18 soldiers and policemen in Tucumán Province.

Veterans' demands 
On 14 December 2007, some 200 soldiers who fought against the guerrillas in Tucumán province demanded an audience with the governor of Tucumán Province, José Jorge Alperovich, claiming they too were victims of the "Dirty War", and demanded a government sponsored military pension as veterans of the counter-insurgency campaign in northern Argentina. Indeed, data from the 2,300-strong Asociación Ex-Combatientes del Operativo Independencia indicate that as of 1976, 4 times more Tucumán veterans have died from suicide after operations in the province. Critics of the ex-servicemen association claim that no combat operations took place in the province and that the government forces deployed in Tucumán killed more than 2,000 innocent civilians. According to Professor Paul H. Lewis, a large percentage of the disappeared in Tucumán were in fact students, professors and recent graduates of the local university, all of whom were caught providing supplies and information to the guerrillas.
On 24 March 2008, some 2,000 Tucumán veterans of the 11,000-strong Movimiento Ex Soldados del Operativo Independencia y del Conflicto Limítrofe con Chile, who fought against ERP guerrillas and were later redeployed along the Andes in the military standoff with Chile, took to the streets of Tucumán city to demand recognition as combat veterans. Some 180,000 Argentine conscripts saw service during the military dictatorship (1976-1983), 130 died as a result of the Dirty War.

Footnotes

External links 
 

1975 in Argentina
1976 in Argentina
Conflicts in 1975
Conflicts in 1976
Counterterrorism in Argentina
Guerrilla wars
Military campaigns involving Argentina
National Reorganization Process
Tucumán Province